is a city located  in central Aichi Prefecture, Japan. , the city had an estimated population of 48,736 in 20,500 households, and a population density of 3,717 persons per km2.

Geography

Takahama is situated in south-central Aichi Prefecture, on Kinuura Bay at the head of Atsumi Peninsula.

Climate
The city has a climate characterized by hot and humid summers, and relatively mild winters (Köppen climate classification Cfa).  The average annual temperature in Takahama is 15.7 °C. The average annual rainfall is 1592 mm with September as the wettest month. The temperatures are highest on average in August, at around 27.8 °C, and lowest in January, at around 4.4 °C.

Demographics
Per Japanese census data, the population of Takahama has been relatively steady over the past 50 years.

Neighboring municipalities
Aichi Prefecture
Kariya
Anjō
Hekinan
Handa
Higashiura

History

Late modern period
Takahama Village was created within Hekikai District on October 1, 1889.
It was raised to town status on July 9, 1900, and annexed neighboring Yoshihama and Takatori villages on May 1, 1906.

Contemporary history
Takahama was raised to city status on December 1, 1970, at which time Hekikai District ceased to exist.

Government

Takahama has a mayor-council form of government with a directly elected mayor and a unicameral city legislature of 16 members.
The city contributes one member to the Aichi Prefectural Assembly. 
In terms of national politics, the city is part of Aichi District 13 of the lower house of the Diet of Japan.

External relations

Twin towns – Sister cities

National
Sister city
Mizunami（Gifu Prefecture, Chūbu region）
since, 1989
Disaster Alliance city
Tajimi（Gifu Prefecture, Chūbu region）
since November 2, 2005

Economy

Primary sector of the economy

Animal husbandry
Chicken Farming - Torimeshi

Forestry
Wood Processing

Secondary sector of the economy

Manufacturing
Automobile Manufacturing
Ceramic Industry

Education

Schools
Takahama has five public elementary schools and two public junior high schools operated by the city government, and two public high school operated by the Aichi Prefectural Board of Education. There is also one private high school.

Transportation

Railways

Conventional lines
Meitetsu
Meitetsu Mikawa Line：-  -  -  -

Roads

Japan National Route

Notable people
 Yuzuru Azusa – singer
 Ōoka Tatsu – painter
 Masaaki Ohata – jockey
 Ryo Sakakibara – baseball player
 Taka Hamako – cartoonist, wife of Yoshiyuki Sadamoto
 Takeuchi Satifo – lead for pop band Takeuchi Denki, guitar
 Shigeharu Naito – trainer for Japan Racing Association
 Yamashita Katsurafumi – vocalist for the pop band Takeuchi
 Ikuei Yamamoto – wrestler

References

External links

 

 
Cities in Aichi Prefecture
Port settlements in Japan
Populated coastal places in Japan